Beggars in Ermine is a 1934 American pre-Code film directed by Phil Rosen.

Plot
John Dawson, a steel-mill owner loses his legs and his company in an accident engineered by his crooked secretary/treasurer, Jim Marley. After meeting a blind peddler, Marchant, he travels the country, under an assumed name, organizing beggars, peddlers, and the handicapped into a dues-paying system.

Cast
Lionel Atwill as John "Flint" Dawson aka John Daniels
Betty Furness as Joyce Dawson
Henry B. Walthall as Marchant the Blind Man
Jameson Thomas as James "Jim" Marley
James Bush as Lee Marley, Jim's Son
Astrid Allwyn as Mrs. Vivian Dawson
George 'Gabby' Hayes as Joe Wilson
Stephen Gross as Scott Taggart, Joyce's Lawyer
Sam Godfrey as Enright, Marley's Lawyer
Myrtle Stedman as Nurse
Lee Phelps as Joe Swanson, Night Crane Operator

Historical context
There are two basic methods that business tycoons employ to grow their wealth. Some leaders fight and scratch and struggle to the top, destroying anyone and anything that gets in their way. They use their wit and the power of fear to great advantage, and they do indeed rise to the top many times. Some leaders combine their wit to engage the help of many others who will join them on their quest. Napoleon Hill, who was taught the principles of wealth by Andrew Carnegie and Henry Ford, calls it the ‘Master Mind Group’ principle. One man of conviction and focus can accomplish great things indeed, but when one man can, by use of a pleasing personality and a plan, convince a group of men and women to join him in his vision, there is absolutely no limit to their efforts. Jim Marley in this story is the first kind of businessman. He will steal Flint's wife, contrive to dump a bucket of hot molten steel on his partner Flint to kill him, and continue to deceive and cheat everyone around him, until he alone owns every bit of the mighty steel mill and the wealth that goes with it. Marley's partner Flint Dawson will lose his legs when the molten steel is poured onto him, and while he is recovering in the hospital his wife will sell his half of the steel mill and take the money and sail to Europe. Flint Dawson gets out of the hospital with no money and no legs. The only thing he can do to earn his next meal is to become a beggar. But even though Flint has no legs and no money, he has a brain and he has a plan. He can do what Marley could never do. He can meet and befriend other beggars, . . . Thousands of beggars. One man with no legs, but thousands of friends, can get the best kind of revenge on his partner Marley. The very best kind of revenge. Pop a big bowl of white kernel popcorn with plenty of warm melted butter drizzled over it and enjoy the show.

References

External links

1934 films
American business films
American drama films
1934 drama films
American black-and-white films
Monogram Pictures films
Films based on American novels
Films scored by Edward Ward (composer)
Films directed by Phil Rosen
1930s English-language films
1930s American films